Amy Lehpamer is an Australian musical theatre performer.

Originally a violinist, Lehpamer's early stage roles include Young Phyllis in Follies in 2008, Shane Warne: The Musical in 2008 and 2009, and The Threepenny Opera in 2010.

She received notice as Sherrie in Rock of Ages in 2011, Christine Colgate in Dirty Rotten Scoundrels in 2013, the title role in the premiere of Margaret Fulton - Queen of the Dessert in 2012, and Reza in Once in 2014 and 2015.

Lehpamer performed the leading role of Maria in the Australian tour of The Sound of Music in 2015 and 2016, followed by Dusty Springfield in Dusty for The Production Company in late 2016 and early 2017. She played Cynthia Weil in the Australian production of Beautiful: The Carole King Musical, receiving a Helpmann Award for Best Female Actor in a Supporting Role in a Musical in 2018.

She plays Principal Mullins in the Australian production of School of Rock the Musical.

References 

Australian musical theatre actresses
Helpmann Award winners
Living people
Year of birth missing (living people)